Thiago de Lima (born September 25, 1988) is a Brazilian football player.

References

External links

1988 births
Living people
Brazilian footballers
J2 League players
Thespakusatsu Gunma players
Association football midfielders